Őrség National Park is a Hungarian National Park established in 2002 with a total area of .

The region takes its name Őrség (meaning 'watch post') from the Magyars, who in order to defend the western gates, built watch posts across this land. Over the centuries, the landscape has been shaped by farming on small sections keeping harmony in relations with nature and maintaining diversity.

References

https://www.orseg.info/en/index.html

National parks of Hungary
Protected areas established in 2002
Birdwatching sites in Hungary
2002 establishments in Hungary